Einar Laurentius Koefoed (1875–1963) was a Danish-born marine biologist who spent most of his professional career in Norway.

Taxon named in his honor 
Searsia koefoedi  (Koefoed's searsid) is named after Einar Koefoed. Also the genus Einara might be named after him.

Taxon described by him
See :Category:Taxa named by Einar Laurentius Koefoed

References

1875 births
1963 deaths
Fisheries scientists
20th-century Danish zoologists
20th-century Norwegian zoologists